The Butterfield Overland Mail in Arkansas and Missouri was created by the United States Congress on March 3, 1857, and operated until March 30, 1861.  The route that was operated extended from San Francisco, California to Los Angeles, then across the Colorado Desert to Fort Yuma, then across New Mexico Territory via, Tucson and Mesilla, New Mexico to Franklin, Texas, midpoint on the route.  The route then crossed Texas to the Red River and into Indian Territory to enter Arkansas at Fort Smith.  Fort Smith was terminal where the secondary route that crossed Arkansas and across the Mississippi River to Memphis, Tennessee, met the main route that led northeast to Tipton with the final leg by train via the Pacific Railroad to St. Louis.  The Arkansas and Missouri mail route was one division, the 8th under a superintendent.

Stations

8th_Division
 Fort Smith

Fort Smith to Memphis Route 
 Charleston, Arkansas
 Paris, Arkansas
 Stinnett's Station
 Dardanelle, Arkansas
 Norristown (Russellville, Arkansas)
 Pottsville Inn
 Hurricane Station
 Lewisburg (near present-day Morrilton, Arkansas)
 Plumer's Station (Plumerville, Arkansas)
 Cadron Station
 Atlanta (present-day Austin, Arkansas)
 Des Arc
 Madison, Arkansas
 Memphis, Tennessee

Main 8th_Division Route

Arkansas Stations

 Fort Smith
 Van Buren
 Woolsey's Station (also called Signal Hill)
 Brodie's Station (Lee Creek)
 Park's Station
 Fayetteville
 Fitzgerald's Station (near present-day Springdale, Arkansas)
 Callahan's Station (near present-day Rogers, Arkansas)

Missouri Stations
 Harbin's Station
 Crouch's Station
 Smith's Station
 Ashmore's Station
 Springfield
 Evan's Station
 Smith's Station
 Bolivar
 Yoast's Station
 Quincy
 Bailey's Station
 Warsaw
 Burn's Station
 Mulholland's Station
 Schackleford's Station
 Tipton
 Pacific Railroad
 St. Louis

See also
 Butterfield Overland Mail in California
 Butterfield Overland Mail in Baja California
 Butterfield Overland Mail in New Mexico Territory
 Butterfield Overland Mail in Texas
 Butterfield Overland Mail in Indian Territory

References

Arkansas and Missouri
Historic trails and roads in Arkansas
Historic trails and roads in Missouri
Stagecoach stops in the United States
History of Arkansas
History of Missouri
American frontier